Hoffmans is a hamlet located northwest of Rotterdam Junction in the town of Glenville in Schenectady County, New York, United States. NY-5 runs east-west through the hamlet. Hoffmans is located on the north bank of the Mohawk River.

References

Hamlets in New York (state)
Hamlets in Schenectady County, New York
Populated places on the Mohawk River